The Education Act 1993 was an act passed by the Parliament of the United Kingdom following the publication of the Major government's education white paper Choice and Diversity: a New Framework for Schools. The act was meant to bring further diversity, accountability and autonomy for schools by expanding the amount with grant-maintained status and enabling secondaries to become specialists in non-core subjects, giving parents more choice. The act also defined special needs in education, greatly expanded the powers of the Education Secretary (in place of the LEAs') and established the School Curriculum and Assessment Authority. The act was the longest piece of educational legislation in British history until the assent of the larger Education Act 1996, which also repealed the act. The Education Act 1996 consolidated the Education Act 1993.

References

External links 

 Education Act 1993 (as enacted)

1993 in education
United Kingdom Acts of Parliament 1993
United Kingdom Education Acts
July 1993 events in the United Kingdom